Rough, Tough and Ready is a 1945 American war comedy drama film directed by Del Lord and starring Chester Morris, Victor McLaglen and Jean Rogers. It aimed to replicate the success of the series of buddy films that McLaglen had previously starred in with Edmund Lowe.

The film's sets were designed by the art director Walter Holscher.

Synopsis
A deep sea diver running a maritime salvage company enlists after the Attack on Pearl Harbor. He enjoys a playful rivalry with his best friend over women, particularly concerning the joint owner of the salvage company who has joined the WACs.

Main cast
 Chester Morris as Brad Crowder 
 Victor McLaglen as Owen McCarey 
 Jean Rogers as Jo Matheson 
 Veda Ann Borg as Lorine Gray 
 Amelita Ward as Kitty Duval 
 Robert B. Williams as Paul 
 John Tyrrell as Herbie 
 Fred Graff as Tony

References

Bibliography
 Michael S. Shull. Hollywood War Films, 1937–1945: An Exhaustive Filmography of American Feature-Length Motion Pictures Relating to World War II. McFarland, 2006.

External links

1945 films
American war drama films
American black-and-white films
1940s war drama films
1940s English-language films
Films directed by Del Lord
Columbia Pictures films
World War II films made in wartime
Seafaring films
1945 drama films